The Liberty Flames men's soccer team is an intercollegiate varsity sports team of Liberty University. The team is a member of the ASUN Conference of the National Collegiate Athletic Association. Twice in the program's history they have qualified for the NCAA Division I Men's Soccer Championship, earning bids into the 2007 and 2011 editions of the tournament while a member of the Big South Conference.

Roster

References

External links
 

 
1979 establishments in Virginia
Association football clubs established in 1979